Punta San Carlos is a small fishing village on the west coast of the state of Baja California just off Highway 1, about 80 km
south of El Rosario on a dirt track. It is part of the Municipio of Ensenada.  The area has become a popular Windsurfing and Kitesurfing destination.

References

Cities in Ensenada Municipality